Floral City Heritage Days is an annual celebration in Floral City, Florida. Established in 1993, it takes place the first weekend of December and celebrates the area's history, including phosphate mining and historic homes. The event includes a fish fry, horse-drawn carriage rides, luminaries and caroling. It is hosted by the Floral City Heritage Council.

2020 will see the event go on hiatus until 2021.

See also
Floral City Heritage Museum

References

Further reading
Heritage Days

External links
Floral City Heritage Days YouTube video

Festivals in Florida
Tourist attractions in Citrus County, Florida